Whiting is an unincorporated community located on the west side of Manchester Township in Ocean County, New Jersey, United States. It is in the Eastern Standard time zone with an elevation of 180 ft. It is home to various retirement communities. The ZIP Code Tabulation Area for the Whiting 08759 ZIP code has a population of 33,180 as of the 2019 Population Estimates Program from the United States Census Bureau.

Whiting was once a station stop on the Southern branch of the Central Railroad of New Jersey, a line known for the Blue Comet express. Whiting Station was located at the intersection of Diamond Road and Station Road.

Education
St. Mary Academy near Manahawkin, a K-8 school of the Roman Catholic Diocese of Trenton, is in the area. From 1997, until 2019 it operated as All Saints Regional Catholic School and was collectively managed by five churches, with one being St. Elizabeth Ann Seton Church in Whiting. In 2019 St. Mary Church in Barnegat took over control of the school, which remained on the same Manahawkin campus, and changed its name. The other churches no longer operate the school but still may send students there.

Notable people

People who were born in, residents of, or otherwise closely associated with Whiting include:
 Joe Cinderella (1927–2012), jazz guitarist.

References

External links 

Whiting Reading Center – Ocean County Library
Whiting Current Weather Conditions
Whiting Memorial Park & Mausoleum

Manchester Township, New Jersey
Populated places in the Pine Barrens (New Jersey)
Unincorporated communities in Ocean County, New Jersey
Unincorporated communities in New Jersey